A. J. Davis may refer to:
Alexander Jackson Davis (1803–1892), architect
Andrew Jackson Davis (1826–1910), an American Spiritualist
A. J. Davis (cornerback, born 1983), American football player
A. J. Davis (cornerback, born 1989), American football player
A. J. Davis (basketball), American professional basketball player